Kerri Lee Green (born ) is an American actress, best known for her roles in The Goonies (1985),  Summer Rental (1985), and Lucas (1986). She also co-wrote and directed the film Bellyfruit (1999).

Early life
Green grew up in Woodcliff Lake and graduated from Pascack Hills High School and Vassar College. She worked at a Roy Rogers restaurant and made commercials for Jordache jeans and Bold 3 detergent.

Career
Green is best known for her roles as a young teen in a string of teen flicks in the 1980s, including Summer Rental (1985), in which she starred as the daughter of a stressed-out air traffic controller (John Candy). Her big break came in the 1985 film The Goonies, in which she played cheerleader-turned-adventurer Andrea "Andy" Carmichael.

She gained further critical acclaim for her performance in Lucas (1986), in which she starred as the center of a love triangle between the characters of Corey Haim and Charlie Sheen. However, her next film, Three for the Road (1987), which featured Charlie Sheen and Alan Ruck, did not fare as well.

Green later appeared in a 1990 episode of In the Heat of the Night , performed in an independent film called Blue Flame, and played the role of secretary of Paul Reiser's character in two episodes of the television sitcom Mad About You. 

Green eventually co-founded a film production company, Independent Women Artists, with Bonnie Dickenson. With Dickenson, she co-wrote and directed the film adaptation of a play about teen pregnancy called Bellyfruit (1999).

Personal life
Green took a break from acting to study art at Vassar College, where she was roommates with Marisa Tomei's brother, Adam, and with BioShock developer Ken Levine.

Filmography

References

External links
 

1967 births
Living people
20th-century American actresses
21st-century American actresses
Actresses from New Jersey
American child actresses
American film actresses
American television actresses
Pascack Hills High School alumni
People from Woodcliff Lake, New Jersey
Vassar College alumni